The Münster Marathon is an annual marathon road running event which takes place in September in the city of Münster, Germany.

Past winners
Key:

External links

Official website

Marathons in Germany
Sport in Münster
2002 establishments in Germany
Autumn events in Germany